Lina Gjorcheska and Diāna Marcinkēviča were the defending champions, but Gjorcheska chose not to participate.

Marcinkēviča chose to partner Daniela Seguel and successfully defended the title, defeating Irina Bara and Mihaela Buzărnescu 6–3, 6–3 in the final.

Seeds

Draw

External Links
Main Draw

L'Open Emeraude Solaire de Saint-Malo - Doubles
L'Open Emeraude Solaire de Saint-Malo
L'Open 35 de Saint-Malo